The 2001 Trans America Athletic Conference baseball tournament was held at Alexander Brest Field on the campus of Jacksonville University in Jacksonville, Florida, from May 16 through 19.   won its fifth tournament championship to earn the Trans America Athletic Conference's automatic bid to the 2001 NCAA Division I baseball tournament.

Seeding
The top six teams (based on conference results) from the conference earn invites to the tournament.

Results

All-Tournament Team
The following players were named to the All-Tournament Team.

Tournament Most Valuable Player
Jeremy Kurella was named Tournament Most Valuable Player.  Kurella was an infielder for UCF.

References

Tournament
ASUN Conference Baseball Tournament
Trans America Athletic baseball tournament
Trans America Athletic Conference baseball tournament